San Juan–Laventille is a region of Trinidad. It has a land area of 220.39 km². The San Juan–Laventille Regional Corporation is headquartered at MTS Plaza in Aranguez, San Juan.  Other urban areas include Barataria, Laventille, Morvant and San Juan. It is the smallest region in Trinidad. The region is bordered by Port of Spain in the west to St. Joseph in the east.

Areas

 Maracas Bay/Santa Cruz/La Fillette
 Febeau/Bourg Mulatresse
 Morvant
 Caledonia/Upper Malick
 San Juan West
 St. Ann's/Cascade/Mon Repos West
 St. Barb's/Chinapoo
 Beetham/Picton
 Success/Trou Macaque
 Aranguez/Warner Village
 Barataria
 Petit Bourg/Champ Fleurs/Mt. Lambert
 San Juan East

References
 Local Government Corporations, from Nalis, the National Library and Information Service of Trinidad and Tobago.
 Ministry of Rural Development and Local Government

External links

Regions of Trinidad and Tobago
Trinidad (island)